Galesville is an unincorporated town and census-designated place (CDP) in Anne Arundel County, Maryland, United States. As of the 2010 census, it had a population of 685.

Galesville is located at 38°50'35" north, 76°32'37" west (38.8431707 -76.5435702), along the western shore of the West River, an arm of the Chesapeake Bay.

Demographics

History
The area was an early center of Quaker settlement in America and, through the West River Friends meeting, it is considered the birthplace of organized Quakerism in Maryland. The town was once the terminus of a steamship line connecting to Annapolis and Baltimore. Once a thriving community of Chesapeake Bay watermen and their families, the town has developed an industry around pleasure boating.

See also
 Tulip Hill, plantation house near Galesville

References

External links

 Galesville Heritage Society

Census-designated places in Maryland
Census-designated places in Anne Arundel County, Maryland
Quakerism in Maryland
Maryland populated places on the Chesapeake Bay